is a 1958 action Japanese film directed by Toshio Masuda. Rusty Knife was part of the Nikkatsu film studio's wave of Japanese noir films, made in order to compete with popular American and French films at the Japanese box office. The film became more widely available outside Japan only when Janus Films released a special set of Nikkatsu noir films on DVD, as part of the Criterion Collection. The other films in the set are A Colt Is My Passport, Take Aim at the Police Van, Cruel Gun Story, and I Am Waiting.

Plot
Yukihiko Tachibana is an ex-convict trying to begin a new life after he is released from prison. Unable to forget the rape and consequent suicide of his girlfriend, he seeks revenge against a crime syndicate while resisting the urge to kill again. Meanwhile, the district attorney Karita and his men try to build a case against the same syndicate.

Cast 
 Yujiro Ishihara as Yukihiko Tachibana
 Mie Kitahara as Keiko Nishida
 Shoji Yasui as Karita
 Mari Shiraki as Yuri
 Joe Shishido as Shimabara
 Akira Kobayashi as Makoto Terada
 Masao Shimizu as Shingo Mano
 Noaki Sugiura as Seiji Katsumata
 Toshio Takahara as Takaishi

References

External links 
 

Japanese black-and-white films
1958 films
Films directed by Toshio Masuda
Nikkatsu films
1950s Japanese films